Sigmala was a reptile from the Late Triassic.

Distribution

Classification
Sigmala was named a sphenodont by R.L. Carroll in 1988.

See also
Lepidosauromorpha
Lepidosauria

References

Fossils of Great Britain
Sphenodontia
Triassic lepidosaurs
Fossil taxa described in 1986